Thomas Dale Brown (born August 10, 1949) is a former Major League Baseball pitcher for the Seattle Mariners.

He is currently the pitching coach for the Pensacola Blue Wahoos.

He graduated from Neville High School in Monroe.

External links
, or Pura Pelota

1949 births
Living people
Baseball players from Louisiana
Baton Rouge Cougars players
Bradenton Explorers players
Cardenales de Lara players
American expatriate baseball players in Venezuela
Columbus Astros players
Knoxville Blue Jays players
Major League Baseball pitchers
San Jose Missions players
Seattle Mariners players
Sportspeople from Lafayette, Louisiana
Sportspeople from Monroe, Louisiana
Syracuse Chiefs players
Tacoma Tugs players
Tucson Toros players